Dobrovice is a town in Mladá Boleslav District in the Central Bohemian Region of the Czech Republic. It has about 3,500 inhabitants. It is known for one of the oldest sugar factories in the world.

Administrative parts
Villages of Bojetice, Chloumek, Holé Vrchy, Libichov, Sýčina, Týnec and Úherce are administrative parts of Dobrovice. Chloumek, Libichov and Sýčina form an exclave of the municipal territory.

Geography
It lies on the border between the Jizera Table and Jičín Uplands.

History
The first written mention of Dobrovice is from 1249. In 1541, lords of Chlum built a fortress in Dobrovice. In 1558, Dobrovice gained town rights and the fortress became a castle.

Demographics

Economy
There is a sugar factory in the town since 1831. It is the biggest and the oldest sugar factory in the Czech Republic, one of the oldest sugar factories in the world and the oldest one still working in its original premises. Since 2004 the sugar factory holds the name of its owner, French conglomerate Tereos.

Transport
Dobrovice is located near the D10 motorway, which briefly runs along the northwestern municipal border.

Sights

The late Renaissance town hall was built in 1610 and reconstructed in 1674, after it was damaged by fire. Its tower is a landmark of the town square and today serves as a lookout tower for public.

The Church of Saint Bartholomew was built in the Renaissance-Gothic style in 1559–1571. It is a valuable sacral area with a number of quality sculptures. The Baroque rectory dates from 1709.

The sugar factory opened museums of sugar production, ethanol production and sugar beet processing in May 2010.

Notable people
Bedřich Feuerstein (1892–1936), architect, painter and essayist
Jiří Adamíra (1926–1993), actor
Marie Tomášová (born 1929), actress

References

External links

Cities and towns in the Czech Republic
Populated places in Mladá Boleslav District